The 2005 NASCAR Nextel Cup Series was the 57th season of professional stock car racing in the United States and the 34th modern-era Cup series. The season began on Saturday, February 12. The ten-race Chase for the Nextel Cup started with the Sylvania 300 on Sunday, September 18, and ended on Sunday, November 20, with the Ford 400.

Tony Stewart was the dominant driver going into the ten race "playoff" with five wins. Going into the final race before the Chase for the Cup, Stewart had amassed a 209-point lead over his nearest competitor, Greg Biffle.
Points are reset going into the Chase for the cup, and Stewart's lead was dropped to a 5-point margin. Leading into the final race before the Chase, ten racers were still mathematically contending for the final four spots in the Chase and only one point separated Jamie McMurray in 10th from Ryan Newman in 11th. In the end, the ten racers who qualified for the Chase for the Cup were:

 Tony Stewart (3716)
 Greg Biffle (−185)
 Rusty Wallace (−304)
 Jimmie Johnson (−316)
 Kurt Busch (−412)
 Mark Martin (−443)
 Jeremy Mayfield (−488)
 Carl Edwards (−602)
 Matt Kenseth (−602)
 Ryan Newman (−661)

Overall, Roush Racing was the dominant team going into the Chase for the Cup with five of the ten final racers from their organization (Biffle, Busch, Martin, Edwards, and Kenseth).

This was the first season since his rookie season that Jeff Gordon did not finish in the top 10 in points.

The 2005 season was the first year of competition for the Dodge Charger since 1977, which replaced the Dodge Intrepid, a model that Dodge dropped from its consumer lineup for the 2005 model year. The change did little to improve Dodge's fortunes as a distant third manufacturer in NASCAR Nextel Cup behind Ford and Chevrolet. In 2004, Dodge won 4 of 36 cup races with the Intrepid. In 2005, the Charger won three races. The Charger was, however, much more of a success in the Busch Series, winning 10 of 32.

The 2005 season was the final year for the Ford Taurus, which was replaced by the Ford Fusion in the 2006 season. In addition, two prominent drivers announced that this would be their final season in NASCAR: Mark Martin, and 1989 Winston Cup Champion Rusty Wallace. Wallace would stay with his word and retire at season's end, but Martin, however, would return for 2006 due to circumstances with Roush Racing and Kurt Busch at the end of 2005. He would then run a limited schedule in 2007 and 2008, then drive full-time Hendrick Motorsports between 2009 and 2011, picking up an additional 5 wins with the team, and then finally run part-time again before officially retiring at the end of the 2013 season. Also, Ricky Rudd took a break after the 2005 season but returned at the beginning of 2007.

One of the biggest controversies prior to the start of the season involved the elimination of two races – Darlington and North Carolina Speedway in Rockingham. The eliminated Rockingham race ends NASCAR's 38-year association with Rockingham. The races were replaced by new races at Texas and Phoenix. NASCAR also began moving start times later in the day starting this season; by 2007 the Daytona 500 finished in primetime.

Also, NASCAR announced in January 2005 that the owners of the teams in the top 35 of the previous year's standings would be guaranteed a starting spot in each of the first five races of the season. This further complicated the unique qualifying procedure for the Daytona 500 and severely affected the chances of some teams to make races after having a poor 2004. After the fifth race, the guaranteed starters were based on the current season's points, with changes possible from race to race depending on results.

The number of cars entered for each race was up slightly from the previous year. The Daytona 500 saw a dramatic increase in its car count from 45 to 56. The increase was in part attributable to a new NASCAR rule that allowed hard liquor brands to become sponsors on its race cars. Roush Racing (Crown Royal), Richard Childress Racing (Jack Daniels), and Robby Gordon Motorsports (Jim Beam) were the first to sign such deals.

At the end of the 2005 season, Chevrolet won the NASCAR Manufacturers' Championship after winning 17 events and garnering 259 points over second-place Ford who captured 16 victories and 146 points.

Teams and drivers

Complete schedule

Limited schedule

Driver changes 
 Mike Bliss drove full-time with Haas CNC Racing after competing in the final two races for Haas in 2004.
 Robby Gordon left Richard Childress Racing to drive for his own team Robby Gordon Motorsports.
 Jeff Burton moved over to the No. 31 after competing in the last fourteen races in the No. 30 for Richard Childress Racing.
 Travis Kvapil drove full-time with Penske-Jasper Racing after driving their R&D car in four of the last five races in 2004.
 Kyle Busch and Terry Labonte swapped seats with Hendrick Motorsports. Busch drove the No. 5 and Labonte drove the No. 44 R&D car on a part-time schedule.
 Jason Leffler joined Joe Gibbs Racing in 2005.
 Mike Wallace drove full-time with Morgan-McClure Motorsports after competing in the final two races for them in 2004.
 Dave Blaney moved over to the No. 07 after competing in eight races in the No. 30 for Richard Childress Racing in 2004.
 Bobby Hamilton Jr. drove full-time with PPI Motorsports after competing in eleven races in 2004.

Team changes 
 Front Row Motorsports will run a full-time schedule as the No. 92.
 Kirk Shelmerdine Racing will run a part-time schedule.
 Michael Waltrip Racing, Bill Davis Racing, Mach 1 Motorsports and McGlynn Racing formed an alliance to run the No. 00
 MB Sutton Motorsports ran the No. 36 rather than MB2 Motorsports.
 R&J Racing will run a full-time schedule as the No. 37.

Schedule

Races

Budweiser Shootout 

The Budweiser Shootout was held on February 12, the Daytona International Speedway, Jimmie Johnson took the 70-lap night exhibition race from Ryan Newman and Jeff Gordon.

Top Ten Results
 48- Jimmie Johnson
 12- Ryan Newman
 24- Jeff Gordon
 20- Tony Stewart
 16- Greg Biffle
 97- Kurt Busch
 8- Dale Earnhardt Jr.
 6- Mark Martin
 9- Kasey Kahne
 18- Bobby Labonte

Gatorade Duel 

The main story out of the Gatorade Duel was a racing accident between Jimmie Johnson and Kevin Harvick, which turned into a minor feud. Michael Waltrip won race one and Tony Stewart won race two, where the controversial incident took place.

Race One Top Ten
 15- Michael Waltrip
 8- Dale Earnhardt Jr.
 23- Mike Skinner
 12- Ryan Newman
 21- Ricky Rudd
 97- Kurt Busch
 24- Jeff Gordon
 42- Jamie McMurray
 5- Kyle Busch
 00- Kenny Wallace
 A fan favorite to make the Daytona 500 was Kerry Earnhardt, but he failed to make the race when Kenny Wallace beat him by 9 one-thousandths of a second (0.009) to get in the 2nd and final transfer spot, due to both teams not being in the top 35 in 2004 owner's points.

Race Two Top Ten
 20- Tony Stewart
 31- Jeff Burton
 37- Kevin Lepage
 1- Martin Truex Jr.
 10- Scott Riggs
 17- Matt Kenseth
 7- Robby Gordon
 22- Scott Wimmer
 40- Sterling Marlin
 36- Boris Said

Daytona 500 

 Complete Results

The 2005 Daytona 500 was run on Sunday, February 20, 2005. Dale Jarrett won the pole for the race.

Top 10 Results

 24 - Jeff Gordon
 97 - Kurt Busch
 8 - Dale Earnhardt Jr.
 10 - Scott Riggs
 48 - Jimmie Johnson
 6 - Mark Martin
 20 - Tony Stewart
 40 - Sterling Marlin
 37 - Kevin Lepage
 2 - Rusty Wallace

 This race was scheduled for 200 laps but went 203 laps because of a Green-White-Checkered finish.
 Last career pole for Dale Jarrett.

Auto Club 500 

 Complete Results

The Auto Club 500 was run on Sunday, February 27, 2005, and is run over 250 2-mile laps on a D oval at California Speedway, Fontana.

Magic Johnson gave the command to drivers to start their engines, and California governor Arnold Schwarzenegger waved the green flag, which was taken by 19-year-old Kyle Busch. Busch became the youngest driver to ever take the green flag on pole position. Busch was still leading after the first lap, with Brian Vickers in second place.

Before the race, Greg Biffle had promised to reporters and commentators that he would have the lead within 5 laps. He also happened to promise to win the race.

Greg Biffle took the lead in only 4 laps, followed by Matt Kenseth in second place, and Biffle was still in the lead after 26 laps when Bill Elliott went into the wall. Biffle was immediately overtaken by Matt Kenseth after the restart. Dale Earnhardt Jr. pitted on lap 38, going down a lap, with problems on his left front tire. Carl Edwards took over the lead around lap 46.

On lap 59, Earnhardt – already a lap down – had another problem with his left front tire and the debris brought out the caution a lap later. Ultimately Earnhardt would end up 13 laps behind. Edwards was still in the lead when the caution came out. Kenseth took over the lap during the caution, and Edwards retook it within a lap. Kenseth recaptured the lead at lap 70.

Green flag pitstops started on lap 105. However, on lap 107, well before the green flag pitstops had cycled, a caution came out for debris. Joe Nemechek led on the restart on lap 116. Dave Blaney hit the wall on lap 143 leading to the third caution, with Nemechek still leading over Johnson. At the restart on lap 151, Nemechek was leading from Mark Martin and Jimmie Johnson with 26 cars on the lead lap. Within a lap, Johnson was second.

Another caution came out on lap 161 when Kasey Kahne went into the wall. At the restart, Johnson led over Nemechek, but after a three-car tussle for the lead, Nemechek led on lap 166. However, Nemechek's success was short-lived: around lap 180, engine problems saw him fall down the leader board and he had to retire. Edwards took over the lead. Harvick then took over with about 55 laps to go.

With 48 laps to go Michael Waltrip's engine blew, bringing out the 6th caution, and when the green came out with 41 laps to go, Harvick was leading in front of Kenseth and Gordon. With 34 laps to go, the 7th caution came out because Jason Leffler was in trouble. Most of the leaders pitted, but cars that stayed out took the first six places on the restart, led by Kurt Busch. The race restarted with 29 laps to go.

With 25 laps to go, Busch and Biffle pulled out into a 2-second lead, vying together for first place. Greg Biffle finally retook the lead on lap 228 and kept it to win the race ahead of Jimmie Johnson and Kurt Busch, with only 0.525 of a second separating the top three men.

Top Ten Results

 16- Greg Biffle
 48- Jimmie Johnson
 97- Kurt Busch
 42- Jamie McMurray
 99- Carl Edwards
 29- Kevin Harvick
 6- Mark Martin
 38- Elliott Sadler
 12- Ryan Newman
 2- Rusty Wallace

Failed to qualify: Stanton Barrett (#92), Hermie Sadler (#66), Stan Boyd (#79), Eric McClure (#73), Kirk Shelmerdine (#27)

UAW-DaimlerChrysler 400 

 Complete Results

The UAW-DaimlerChrysler 400 was run on Sunday, March 13, 2005, and is run over 267 laps of the Las Vegas Motor Speedway in Las Vegas, Nevada.

Ryan Newman started on the pole. Greg Biffle soon took over. The 1st caution came out on lap 12 when Dale Earnhardt Jr. touched Brian Vickers coming into turn 1. Bobby Labonte and Ricky Rudd were also involved. All 4 cars were out of the race. The race restarts on lap 20 and Kurt Busch had the lead, only for Biffle took it again soon afterward.

Newman then got up to within 0.5 seconds of Biffle, and the lead remained for a long green-flag run; this would end on lap 59 when Robby Gordon's engine blew up, bringing out the 2nd caution. Sterling Marlin stayed out to lead a lap but at the restart, Newman was led over by Travis Kvapil and Greg Biffle in 2nd and 3rd positions respectively. Shortly after the restart, a crash occurred on lap 65, when Matt Kenseth nudged the back of Elliott Sadler's car; this would bring out the 3rd caution. Carl Edwards and Tony Stewart were also involved, though the latter's car only received minor damage.

The race restarted came on lap 70 with Newman taking the lead, having Kvapil, Jimmie Johnson, and Biffle behind him. On lap 77, Kenseth went a lap behind after a tire went down as a result of his crash with Sadler earlier.

Lap 86 brought out the 4th caution when Jason Leffler, trying to get onto pit road, got pushed by Ken Schrader. Most drivers pitted, with Kasey Kahne ending up in the lead from Newman and Kvapil. Ku. Busch was leading from Johnson and Biffle when the 6th caution came out on lap 126. An error in the pits, however, saw Kvapil drop to 23rd place.

Jimmie Johnson took the lead on lap 147. On lap 175, the 7th caution flew for debris, with Johnson still out in front. Newman took the green from Johnson, Busch, and Biffle. The trouble occurred when Scott Riggs brought out the eighth caution with 74 laps to go, with Sadler getting the free pass.

Newman, Johnson, and Joe Nemechek led at the restart, with Johnson swiftly regaining the lead. Debris brought out yet another caution with 62 laps to go. Newman and Johnson battled for the lead at the restart. With 44 to go, Hermie Sadler crashed into the inside wall bringing out another caution with Johnson leading over Gordon. The battle resumed with 39 laps left. Newman got into the back of Gordon with 34 laps to go, which caused them to lose 3 positions.

With 15 to go, Jimmie Johnson had got a 1.5-second lead over Kyle Busch, who was 5 seconds ahead of Ku. Busch. An error by Johnson lost him 0.8 seconds, but he then extended his lead again, and he won from the Busch brothers.

Top Ten Results
 48- Jimmie Johnson
 5- Kyle Busch
 97- Kurt Busch
 24- Jeff Gordon
 29- Kevin Harvick
 16- Greg Biffle
 41- Casey Mears
 17- Matt Kenseth
 12- Ryan Newman
 20- Tony Stewart

Failed to qualify: Johnny Sauter (#09), Kevin Lepage (#37), Stanton Barrett (#92), Stan Boyd (#79), Carl Long (#00), Kirk Shelmerdine (#27)

Golden Corral 500 

 Complete Results

The Golden Corral 500 was held on March 20 at Atlanta Motor Speedway.

Carl Edwards won the race, edging out driver Jimmie Johnson by .028 (28 thousandths) of a second. Johnson swapped the lead with Greg Biffle for most of the race.

Top Ten Results

 99- Carl Edwards*
 48- Jimmie Johnson
 16- Greg Biffle
 6- Mark Martin
 9- Kasey Kahne
 25- Brian Vickers
 15- Michael Waltrip
 07- Dave Blaney
 10- Scott Riggs
 38- Elliott Sadler

Failed to qualify: Randy LaJoie (#34), John Andretti (#14), Stanton Barrett (#92), Carl Long (#00), Kirk Shelmerdine (#27), Hermie Sadler (#66), Morgan Shepherd (#89)

 This was Carl Edwards' first career NASCAR Nextel Cup Series victory. Combined with his Busch Series victory already that weekend, Edwards became the third driver in 2005 to win a race in all three of NASCAR's top series.

Food City 500 
 Complete Results

The Food City 500 was held on April 3 at Bristol Motor Speedway.

Top Ten Results

 29- Kevin Harvick
 38- Elliott Sadler
 20- Tony Stewart
 8- Dale Earnhardt Jr.
 88- Dale Jarrett
 48- Jimmie Johnson
 77- Travis Kvapil
 45- Kyle Petty
 16- Greg Biffle
 10- Scott Riggs

Final career race leading the most laps for Rusty Wallace.

Failed to qualify: Johnny Sauter (#09), Kevin Lepage (#37), Robby Gordon (#7), Randy LaJoie (#34), Brad Teague (#27), Jason Jarrett (#89)

Advance Auto Parts 500 

 Complete Results

The Advance Auto Parts 500 was held on April 10 at Martinsville.

Jeff Gordon won the race. He rallied from 3 laps down to win his sixth victory at Martinsville and his 71st career victory. Kasey Kahne was the runner-up and Mark Martin finished third.

Top Ten Results

 24- Jeff Gordon
 9- Kasey Kahne
 6- Mark Martin
 12- Ryan Newman
 2- Rusty Wallace
 40- Sterling Marlin
 21- Ricky Rudd
 48- Jimmie Johnson
 38- Elliott Sadler
 01- Joe Nemechek

Failed to qualify: Stanton Barrett (#92), Jeff Fuller (#61), Kirk Shelmerdine (#27), Carl Long (#00)

Samsung/Radio Shack 500 
 Complete Results

The Samsung/Radio Shack 500 was held on April 17 at Texas Motor Speedway.

Greg Biffle had a dominating performance, leading 219 of 334 laps, en route to victory. Jamie McMurray was second and Jimmie Johnson third.

Top Ten Results

 16- Greg Biffle
 42- Jamie McMurray
 48- Jimmie Johnson
 41- Casey Mears
 40- Sterling Marlin
 15- Michael Waltrip
 97- Kurt Busch
 21- Ricky Rudd
 8- Dale Earnhardt Jr.
 2- Rusty Wallace

Failed to qualify: Kevin Lepage (#37), Stanton Barrett (#92), Randy LaJoie (#34)

 Final career Top 5 finish for Sterling Marlin

Subway Fresh 500 
 Complete Results

The Subway Fresh 500 was a night race held on April 23 at Phoenix International Raceway. This race was the first of two races held at Phoenix for the 2005 Nextel Cup season after only running one race in previous years.

Kurt Busch won the race. Michael Waltrip was the runner-up, leading a DEI resurgence. Jeff Burton finished third.

Top Ten Results

 97- Kurt Busch
 15- Michael Waltrip
 31- Jeff Burton
 8- Dale Earnhardt Jr.
 25- Brian Vickers
 18- Bobby Labonte
 99- Carl Edwards
 5- Kyle Busch
 09- Johnny Sauter
 01- Joe Nemechek

Failed to qualify: Hermie Sadler (#66), Steve Portenga (#34), Brandon Ash (#02)

 Clint Bowyer made his NASCAR Nextel Cup debut in this race, finishing in 22nd

Aaron's 499 
 Complete Results

The Aaron's 499 was held on May 1 at Talladega Superspeedway.

Jeff Gordon won his third race of the season leading a dominating 139 of 194 laps for his 72nd career Nextel Cup win, winning four of his last five restrictor-plate races, holding off Tony Stewart and Michael Waltrip during a green-white-checkered finish.

The "Big One" struck at lap 132, when a few cars got together and spun in front of the field. In total, 25 cars were involved, making it one of the largest crashes in NASCAR history. There was also a six-car crash at lap 186, taking out a few of the leaders that had not been involved in the prior crash.

Scheduled distance: 188 laps. (501 mi, 807 km) Actual distance: 194 laps. (517 mi, 833 km)

Top Ten Results

 24- Jeff Gordon
 20- Tony Stewart
 15- Michael Waltrip
 19- Jeremy Mayfield
 42- Jamie McMurray
 38- Elliott Sadler
 97- Kurt Busch
 49- Ken Schrader
 88- Dale Jarrett
 31- Jeff Burton

Failed to qualify: Robby Gordon (#7), Kevin Lepage (#37), Kenny Wallace (#00), Stanton Barrett (#92)

Dodge Charger 500 

 Complete Results

The Dodge Charger 500 was held on May 7 at Darlington Raceway and was the first nighttime race held at the track. The race also broke two NASCAR traditions by being the only race held at Darlington in 2005 and by running the race on Mother's Day weekend.

Greg Biffle led a race-high 176 of 370 laps en route to his third Nextel Cup victory of 2005. With four laps to go, Biffle's Roush Racing teammate Mark Martin spun out (sliding into the apron) trying to pass third-place runner and pole-sitter Kasey Kahne. Biffle took two tires on his final pit stop, while race leader Ryan Newman and Ken Schrader stayed out. Newman was expecting more of the teams, like Schrader in the No. 49 Dodge, at the tail of the lead lap (18 in all) to stay out for track position. Newman accelerated on the restart, brake-checked Schrader to hold off the pack, and accelerated again, leaving Schrader spinning his tires. Biffle passed both of them on a green-white-checkered finish restart. Jeff Gordon finished second, followed by Kahne, Martin, and Newman, who fell back three spots in two laps. Schrader finished in 18th position.

Scheduled distance: 367 laps. (500.322 mi, 805.26 km.) Actual distance: 370 laps. (505.42 mi, 813.4 km.)

Top Ten Results

 16- Greg Biffle
 24- Jeff Gordon
 9- Kasey Kahne
 6- Mark Martin
 12- Ryan Newman
 42- Jamie McMurray
 48- Jimmie Johnson
 8- Dale Earnhardt Jr.
 99- Carl Edwards
 20- Tony Stewart

Failed to qualify: Johnny Sauter (#09), Robby Gordon (#7), Tony Raines (#61), Morgan Shepherd (#89)

Chevy American Revolution 400 

 Complete Results

The Chevy American Revolution 400 was a night race held on May 14 at Richmond International Raceway.

Points leader Jimmie Johnson spun out and hit the wall on lap 81 and did it again while coming to pit road. He ended up finishing 40th and losing valuable ground in the points standings. Teammate Jeff Gordon had similar problems on lap 165 and ended up finishing 39th and losing second place in the standings to Greg Biffle. Kasey Kahne led 242 of 400 laps and pulled away from Tony Stewart in the closing laps to win his first Nextel Cup race in 47 starts, followed by Ryan Newman, rookie Kyle Busch, and Kevin Harvick. After winning this race, Kahne ended up accomplished several tasks during the weekend. He moved up four spots in the standings to 15th position, won the pole for this race and the Busch Series race the day before, was the first driver to win in the new Dodge Charger in 2005, was the final driver to qualify for the Nextel All-Star Challenge at Lowe's Motor Speedway, became the fifth driver in 2005 to have won in all three NASCAR top series for his career, and gave Evernham Motorsports its second consecutive win at Richmond after Jeremy Mayfield's victory in September 2004.

Top Ten Results

 9- Kasey Kahne
 20- Tony Stewart
 12- Ryan Newman
 5- Kyle Busch
 29- Kevin Harvick
 16- Greg Biffle
 38- Elliott Sadler
 18- Bobby Labonte
 15- Michael Waltrip
 42- Jamie McMurray

 This is Kasey Kahne's first career Cup Series win.

Failed to qualify: Kevin Lepage (#37), Jeff Fuller (#34), Kirk Shelmerdine (#27), Carl Long (#00)

Nextel All-Star Challenge 

The Nextel-All Star Challenge was a non-points night race held on May 21 at Lowe's Motor Speedway. The 90-lap race was divided into three segments with the final paying the most money. Also, the top six finishing cars from the first segment were inverted for the second segment. About half of the field was taken out of the race at lap 35 when Tony Stewart ran into the back of Joe Nemechek which caused an incident in the infield between Nemechek and Kevin Harvick. Mark Martin won the race, his second in the event. Elliott Sadler finished in second place. The rest of the top-5 were Nextel Open winner Brian Vickers, Jeff Gordon, and Jimmie Johnson, who are all teammates at Hendrick Motorsports. Martin Truex Jr. was chosen in an internet fan poll as the final entrant for the event.

In the Nextel Open qualifying race, Mike Bliss and Brian Vickers were promised a large bonus paycheck if they won the event and qualified in the All-Star Race. Bliss who started up front led the most laps and led to the white flag. In the final turn of the final lap, Vickers went underneath Bliss and wrecked him. Vickers beat a wrecking Bliss for the win, big paycheck, and the final and only left the spot in the All-Star Race. Bliss was visibly upset and said that Vickers should have been disqualified. Drivers, fans, and owners ridiculed Vickers for his move and sided with Bliss but the results were declared official.

Nextel Open Top Ten Results

 25- Brian Vickers
 0- Mike Bliss
 77- Travis Kvapil
 5- Kyle Busch
 32- Bobby Hamilton Jr.
 41- Casey Mears
 7- Robby Gordon
 21- Ricky Rudd
 49- Ken Schrader
 1- Martin Truex Jr.

Nextel All-Star Challenge Top Ten Results

 6- Mark Martin
 38- Elliott Sadler
 25- Brian Vickers
 24- Jeff Gordon
 48- Jimmie Johnson
 88- Dale Jarrett
 97- Kurt Busch
 19- Jeremy Mayfield
 18- Bobby Labonte
 8- Dale Earnhardt Jr.

Coca-Cola 600 
 Complete Results

Coca-Cola 600 was a night race held on May 29 at Lowe's Motor Speedway, which was the fourth consecutive night race for Nextel Cup in May 2005. This race had 22 caution flags which broke the previous record of 20 held by three races at Bristol Motor Speedway. There was also one red flag that set up the final restart of the night. After approximately 5 hours of racing, Jimmie Johnson passed Bobby Labonte at the start/finish line on the final lap to win his third straight Coca-Cola 600. The rest of the top-5 were Carl Edwards, Jeremy Mayfield, and Ryan Newman with notable mention given to Ken Schrader in 9th, his second top ten of 2005 which had spearheaded his boom to 26th in the points standings.

Top Ten Results

 48- Jimmie Johnson
 18- Bobby Labonte
 99- Carl Edwards
 19- Jeremy Mayfield
 12- Ryan Newman
 16- Greg Biffle
 1- Martin Truex Jr.
 88- Dale Jarrett
 49- Ken Schrader
 2- Rusty Wallace

Failed to qualify: Jason Leffler (#11), Bobby Hamilton Jr. (#32), Hermie Sadler (#66), Boris Said (#36), Jeff Fuller (#34), Carl Long (#00), Tony Raines (#92), Mike Garvey (#75), Kirk Shelmerdine (#27), Greg Sacks (#13)
 First career top-10 for Martin Truex Jr.

MBNA RacePoints 400 
 Complete Results

The MBNA RacePoints 400 was held on June 5 at Dover International Speedway.

Since rain washed out qualifying for the event, the race lineup was determined by the point standings, Jimmie Johnson was on the pole. The MBNA RacePoints 400 had 7 cautions for a total of 33 laps of the 400 completed. The drama began early when on lap 41 an unintentional spin of Jeff Gordon by Tony Stewart brought out the third caution. This ended Jeff Gordon's day with a DNF, which also collected Ricky Rudd. At this point in the race, Kyle Busch was the leader. Just 11 laps later on lap 52, Bobby Labonte incurs another DNF with a blown engine. On lap 145, Kyle Busch reclaims the lead from race leader Elliott Sadler. On lap 285, the last caution of the race is brought out after Kasey Kahne hits the wall, and after pitting Greg Biffle takes the lead. On lap 374, the first in a series of green-flag pit stops takes place. Greg Biffle takes 4 tires on lap 375 while Jimmie Johnson pits for right sides only on lap 384. At the finish of the race, Greg Biffle collects his 4th victory of the season and backs his car into the front stretch wall during his burnout celebration.

Top Ten Results

 16- Greg Biffle
 5- Kyle Busch
 6- Mark Martin
 48- Jimmie Johnson
 2- Rusty Wallace
 25- Brian Vickers
 17- Matt Kenseth
 12- Ryan Newman
 97- Kurt Busch
 38- Elliott Sadler

Failed to qualify: Mike Skinner (#23), Kirk Shelmerdine (#27)

Pocono 500 
 Complete Results

The Pocono 500 was held on June 12 at Pocono Raceway. Michael Waltrip won the pole. This race had a scheduled distance of 200 laps, but because of the Green-White-Checkered finish, the race would go 201 laps. On the restart, Ken Schrader and Bobby Labonte would tangle up into an accident, ending the race under caution.

Top Ten Results
 99- Carl Edwards
 25- Brian Vickers
 01- Joe Nemechek
 5- Kyle Busch
 15- Michael Waltrip
 48- Jimmie Johnson
 6- Mark Martin
 29- Kevin Harvick
 24- Jeff Gordon
 42- Jamie McMurray

Failed to qualify: Kirk Shelmerdine (#27), P. J. Jones (#34), Hermie Sadler (#80), Carl Long (#00)

Batman Begins 400 

 Complete Results

The Batman Begins 400 was held on June 19 at Michigan International Speedway. Ryan Newman won the pole.

Top Ten Results

 16- Greg Biffle
 20- Tony Stewart
 6- Mark Martin
 17- Matt Kenseth
 99- Carl Edwards
 01- Joe Nemechek
 15- Michael Waltrip
 38- Elliott Sadler
 5- Kyle Busch
 2- Rusty Wallace

Failed to qualify: Eric McClure (#92), Derrike Cope (#79), P. J. Jones (#34), Morgan Shepherd (#89)

Dodge/Save Mart 350 

 Complete Results

The Dodge/Save Mart 350 was held on June 26 at Infineon Raceway. Jeff Gordon won the pole.

Top Ten Results

 20- Tony Stewart
 21- Ricky Rudd
 97- Kurt Busch
 2- Rusty Wallace
 88- Dale Jarrett
 38- Elliott Sadler
 19- Jeremy Mayfield
 32- Ron Fellows *
 12- Ryan Newman
 33- Brian Simo *

Failed to qualify: Brandon Ash (#02), Kevin Lepage (#37), Stanton Barrett (#92), Johnny Borneman III (#66), José Luis Ramírez (#52)

 During qualifying, Jeff Gordon broke his own qualifying record at the time of 1:15.950.
 Ron Fellows picked up the only top-ten finish of the year for the #32 team, substituting for Bobby Hamilton Jr. It was Fellows' 2nd consecutive race where he greatly improved his finishing position after qualifying 43rd, having finished 2nd at Watkins Glen the previous year.
 Brian Simo picked up his first and only top ten finish as a road course ringer, driving the #33 RCR Chevrolet.

Pepsi 400 

 Complete Results

The Pepsi 400 was held on July 2 at Daytona International Speedway.

After a two and a half-hour rain delay, the Pepsi 400 finally started, but under a green-yellow start. This start was to allow the cars to dry the track where the jet-dryers could not, mostly in the turns close to the wall. Tony Stewart dominated the race, leading a 400-mile Daytona record 151 of the 160 laps. After the race, Tony Stewart climbed the fence in front of the tri-oval, near the starter's stand. In Victory Lane, he stated, "I'm just too damn fat to be climbing fences, but had to!"

The first laps were uneventful, up to the point of green-flag pit stops. On lap 35, coming around Turn 4, Jeff Gordon signaled to pit and slowed down. Jamie McMurray saw the signal and slowed down, but the driver behind him, Scott Riggs, did not. Riggs drove into the back end of McMurray, forcing Mark Martin to take evasive measures to try to escape. Martin could not get out of the way, bounced off the wall, and created a nine-car pile-up in the process. Martin was out of the race and headed to the garage. Also collected in the wreck was Kurt Busch, whose car was wrecked beyond competitive form. Busch complained of the camera that he thought the current points system, that would reward him for taking a non-competitive car back on track, was stupid. Elliott Sadler ran out of gas on lap 39 and had to be pushed back to pit road, where he lost a lap. He was able to gain it back on lap 65 with the lucky dog award when the caution came out due to debris on the track.

On lap 101, Bobby Hamilton Jr.'s car hit the wall, right after Dale Jarrett and Elliott Sadler pit, allowing them to take the lead. On lap 109, Sadler took the lead from Jarrett, only to give it back to Tony Stewart on lap 110.

Lap 141: Caution again, with the leaders on pit road. Tony Stewart takes four tires and nearly stalls, losing five spots, only to take them back on lap 145, in a four-wide pass.

Other cautions: Lap 69, Jeff Green; Lap 72, Michael Waltrip loses control due to a flat tire, also giving serious damage to the car of Greg Biffle; Lap 113, Boris Said takes a spin in the grass; Lap 147, seven-car incident.

Top Ten Results

 20- Tony Stewart
 42- Jamie McMurray
 8- Dale Earnhardt Jr.
 2- Rusty Wallace
 88- Dale Jarrett
 48- Jimmie Johnson
 24- Jeff Gordon
 4- Mike Wallace
 17- Matt Kenseth
 49- Ken Schrader

Failed to qualify: Mike Garvey (#66), Kenny Wallace (#00), Dan Pardus (#73), Morgan Shepherd (#89)

 The race had started at 10:45 pm ET and ended at 1:48 am.

USG Sheetrock 400 
 Complete Results

The USG Sheetrock 400 was held on July 10 at Chicagoland Speedway, and it ended up being a story of tires. Five of the ten cautions were due to blown tires, and on the last caution, Dale Earnhardt Jr. took only two tires, giving him the lead.

Matt Kenseth arguably had the best car on the track, leading 176 of the 267 laps, 66% of the race, but on lap 243, a debris caution brought most of the field, including Kenseth, come to pit road, allowing Scott Wimmer, who did not pit, to take the lead, followed by Earnhardt, and three cars between him and Kenseth. With one full lap of green-flag racing (249) before another caution, the race was essentially yellow until lap 255, and with only twelve laps, Kenseth was unable to pass four cars and Earnhardt.

Top Ten Results

 8- Dale Earnhardt Jr.
 17- Matt Kenseth
 48- Jimmie Johnson
 25- Brian Vickers
 20- Tony Stewart
 19- Jeremy Mayfield
 21- Ricky Rudd
 97- Kurt Busch
 41- Casey Mears
 6- Mark Martin

Failed to qualify: Kenny Wallace (#92), Mike Garvey (#66), P. J. Jones (#34), Wayne Anderson (#75)

New England 300 

 Complete Results

The New England 300 was held on July 17 at New Hampshire International Speedway.

Tony Stewart dominated the race, leading 232 of the 300 laps, on his way to win his third race of the year. Qualifying in 14th position, he wasted little time in moving to the front, gaining seven spots in the first eight green-flag laps, seizing control of the race on lap 51. The only car that seemed remotely close to being able to catch Stewart, was that of Kurt Busch. Once Stewart took the lead, Busch was the only car that could catch up to and pass Stewart under the green flag, only to be passed again five laps later.

As part of his victory celebration, Tony Stewart again climbed the catch fence up to the flag stand, similar to how he celebrated after the Pepsi 400, two races earlier. When later asked he commented: "Yes, it wore me out climbing the fence again. Yes, I'm still too old and too fat to do it. But I'm not going to stop, so I'll have to hire a trainer."

Top Ten Results

 20- Tony Stewart
 97- Kurt Busch
 18- Bobby Labonte
 5- Kyle Busch
 16- Greg Biffle
 9- Kasey Kahne
 12- Ryan Newman
 2- Rusty Wallace
 8- Dale Earnhardt Jr.
 17- Matt Kenseth

Failed to qualify: Joey McCarthy (#34), Derrike Cope (#52), Wayne Anderson (#75), Hermie Sadler (#92)

Pennsylvania 500 
 Complete Results

The Pennsylvania 500 was held on July 24 at Pocono Raceway. Kurt Busch was the victor in the race that was lengthened by three laps due to the "Green-White-Checkered" rule.

Top Ten Results

 97- Kurt Busch
 2- Rusty Wallace
 6- Mark Martin
 99- Carl Edwards
 12- Ryan Newman
 29- Kevin Harvick
 20- Tony Stewart
 18- Bobby Labonte
 0- Mike Bliss
 21- Ricky Rudd

Failed to qualify: Morgan Shepherd (#89), Hermie Sadler (#92), Carl Long (#00), Derrike Cope (#52)

Allstate 400 at the Brickyard 

 Complete Results

The Allstate 400 at the Brickyard was held on August 7 at Indianapolis Motor Speedway.

Tony Stewart won in front of his home state crowd in Indiana and for the fourth time in the season. A late-race crash by Jimmie Johnson, combined with the win by Stewart, put him into the Nextel Cup points lead. As part of the victory celebration, Tony Stewart went to turn two, where a fan handed him a can of Coca-Cola. Then upon returning to the front stretch, Tony Stewart climbed the fence, along with the rest of his teammates. Kasey Kahne and Jeremy Mayfield finished 2nd and 4th for Evernham Motorsports. If Bill Elliott had finished in the top 10, all Evernham drivers would've finished in the top 10 for the first time that season.

Top Ten Results

 20- Tony Stewart
 9- Kasey Kahne
 25- Brian Vickers
 19- Jeremy Mayfield
 17- Matt Kenseth
 41- Casey Mears
 6- Mark Martin
 24- Jeff Gordon
 40- Sterling Marlin
 5- Kyle Busch

Failed to qualify: Kevin Lepage (#37), Tony Raines (#92), Mike Garvey (#66), Stuart Kirby (#51), Mike Wallace (#4), P. J. Jones (#34), Morgan Shepherd (#89), Kenny Wallace (#00), Jimmy Spencer (#50)

Sirius Satellite Radio at The Glen 

 Complete Results

The Sirius Satellite Radio at The Glen was held on August 14 at Watkins Glen International.

Tony Stewart was the victor in the race that was lengthened due to the "Green-White-Checkered" rule.

Top Ten Results

 20- Tony Stewart
 7- Robby Gordon*
 36- Boris Said*
 40- Scott Pruett*
 48- Jimmie Johnson
 2- Rusty Wallace
 6- Mark Martin
 25- Brian Vickers
 01- Joe Nemechek
 8- Dale Earnhardt Jr.

 Tony Stewart is the last driver to pull off the season sweep on both road course races, and then go on to win that season's Championship until 2020 when Chase Elliott won the Daytona Road Course and Charlotte Roval.
 Tony Stewart is the last driver to win 3 straight road course races (Watkins Glen in 2004, Sonoma and Watkins Glen in 2005) until 2020 when Chase Elliott won 4 straight road course races (Watkins Glen and Charlotte Roval in 2019, Daytona Road Course and Charlotte Roval in 2020)
 Robby Gordon finished 2nd driving for his own team, which was the best finish for the #7 Jim Beam Chevrolet.
 Boris Said placed third for his career-best finish.
 Scott Pruett was substituting for Sterling Marlin, who was attending his father Coo Coo's funeral.

Failed to qualify: Scott Pruett (#39), Chris Cook (#87), Tom Hubert (#27)

GFS Marketplace 400 

 Complete Results

The GFS Marketplace 400 was held on August 21 at Michigan International Speedway.

Joe Nemechek sat on the pole. The race saw an unusually high number of drivers suffering from flat left-rear tires, including Jeff Green, Mike Bliss, Bobby Labonte, Kevin Harvick, and Stuart Kirby. Overheating continued to be a problem at Michigan, with trash frequently getting caught in the grills of the cars. Johnny Benson lost his engine due to overheating. As the race ended, many drivers were running out of fuel. Some drivers pitted while others risked staying out to try to win. Jeremy Mayfield gambled on fuel mileage, taking the lead in the waning laps to win the race.

Top Ten Results

 19- Jeremy Mayfield
 10- Scott Riggs
 17- Matt Kenseth
 99- Carl Edwards
 20- Tony Stewart
 16- Greg Biffle
 97- Kurt Busch
 01- Joe Nemechek
 25- Brian Vickers
 48- Jimmie Johnson

Failed to qualify: P. J. Jones (#34), Carl Long (#00), Eric McClure (#92), Bryan Reffner (#79), Morgan Shepherd (#89)

 This is Jeremy Mayfield's final Cup win.
 Scott Riggs placed second for his career-best finish.

Note: Tony Stewart clinched a spot in the "Chase for the Cup" top ten as a result of this race.

Sharpie 500 
 Complete Results

The Sharpie 500 was held on August 27 at Bristol Motor Speedway. Matt Kenseth won from the pole and led 415 of the 500 laps on his way to victory.
Top Ten Results

 17- Matt Kenseth
 31- Jeff Burton
 16- Greg Biffle
 21- Ricky Rudd
 2- Rusty Wallace
 24- Jeff Gordon
 0- Mike Bliss
 20- Tony Stewart
 8- Dale Earnhardt Jr.
 97- Kurt Busch

Failed to qualify: Wayne Anderson (#75), Mike Garvey (#66), Johnny Sauter (#09), Morgan Shepherd (#89), P. J. Jones (#34), Tony Raines (#37)

Note: Jimmie Johnson, Greg Biffle, and Rusty Wallace clinched spots in the "Chase for the Cup" top ten as a result of this race, with two races until the "chase" is locked in.
 Last career top 5 finish for Ricky Rudd.

Sony HD 500 

 Complete Results

The Sony HD 500 was held on September 4 at California Speedway. In the next-to-the-last race prior to the Chase for the Nextel Cup, Kyle Busch, at 20 years, 4 months, 2 days, became the youngest driver ever to win a Nextel Cup race. The race was lengthened by five laps due to the "Green-White-Checkered" rule. Carl Edwards sat on the pole. Dale Earnhardt Jr. ended his chase hopes after the car expired the engine with 38 laps to go.

Top Ten Results
 5- Kyle Busch
 16- Greg Biffle
 25- Brian Vickers
 99- Carl Edwards
 20- Tony Stewart
 9- Kasey Kahne
 17- Matt Kenseth
 42- Jamie McMurray
 21- Ricky Rudd
 01- Joe Nemechek

Failed to qualify: P. J. Jones (#34), John Andretti (#4)

Note: Mark Martin and Kurt Busch clinched spots in the "Chase for the Cup" top ten as a result of this race, with only one race left until the "chase" is locked in.

 This is also Kyle Busch's first career NASCAR Nextel Cup Series victory, enabling him to complete the NASCAR Triple Threat of winning a race in each of the top series.

Chevy Rock and Roll 400 

 Complete Results

The Chevy Rock and Roll 400 was held on September 10 at Richmond International Raceway. Kevin Harvick sat on the pole after winning the Busch Series race the night before. Coming into the race, which was the final race before the Chase for the 2005 NEXTEL Cup, Ryan Newman, Jeff Gordon, Elliott Sadler, Dale Jarrett, and Kevin Harvick were on the outside looking in at an eleventh place and lower. Jamie McMurray and Tony Raines got into each other at lap 362, ending McMurray's chances to get into the Chase for the Cup.

Kevin Harvick led many of the laps early on, but fell behind late and ended up finishing 10th. Kurt Busch won his third race of the season.

Top Ten Results

 97- Kurt Busch
 17- Matt Kenseth
 16- Greg Biffle
 5- Kyle Busch
 2- Rusty Wallace
 19- Jeremy Mayfield
 20- Tony Stewart
 9- Kasey Kahne
 44- Terry Labonte
 29- Kevin Harvick

Failed to qualify: Wayne Anderson (#75), Stanton Barrett (#95), Carl Long (#00), Hermie Sadler (#92), Morgan Shepherd (#89), Joey McCarthy (#34), Kirk Shelmerdine (#27)

Making The Chase - This was the final race to determine the contenders for the Chase for the Nextel Cup. Those final ten contenders were:

 20- Tony Stewart (3716–5050)
 16- Greg Biffle (3531–5045)
 2- Rusty Wallace (3412–5040)
 48- Jimmie Johnson (3400–5035)
 97- Kurt Busch (3304–5030)
 6- Mark Martin (3273–5025)
 19- Jeremy Mayfield (3228–5020)
 99- Carl Edwards (3114–5015)
 17- Matt Kenseth (3114–5015)
 12- Ryan Newman (3055–5005)

The first number is the number of points on the old system. Following the race, the Chase contenders had their points reset to the second number. For the complete coverage of the playoff, along with driver results, see the 2005 Chase for the NEXTEL Cup section.

Chase for the Nextel Cup

Sylvania 300 

 Complete Results

The Sylvania 300 was held on September 18 at New Hampshire International Speedway. Tony Stewart sat on the pole and led most of the laps in the first race of the Chase to the NASCAR Nextel Cup, battling with Ryan Newman in the final laps and ultimately finishing second behind him. Kurt Busch, one of the ten Chase drivers, was involved in an incident with Scott Riggs early on that set him 66 laps behind the leader. After pulling into the garage, Busch stormed to Riggs' pit and had words with his crew chief, Rodney Childers. Busch finished 35th.

Several other incidents also happened during the race. Kyle Busch got tangled with Kasey Kahne, who was sent hard into the wall. Kahne, who was out for the day, maneuvered his wrecked car in front of Busch under caution. Kahne was later fined $25,000 and docked 25 points and was placed on probation for the remainder of the season. Later on, Michael Waltrip and Robby Gordon got together, ending Gordon's day. On the following caution lap, Gordon tried to ram Waltrip's car with his wrecked car and on the lap after that, Gordon threw his helmet at Waltrip's passing car. In the subsequent live interview on TNT, Gordon called Waltrip a "piece of s**t", and TNT quickly ended the interview. Gordon was later fined $35,000, docked 50 points and like Kahne, was placed on probation for the remainder of the season for the two incidents. Waltrip was fined $10,000 and docked 25 points for apparently using an obscene gesture, but Waltrip and DEI contested the fine with NASCAR and it was overturned. Following that incident, NASCAR waved the red flag to stop the field and clean the track, but also warned all teams and crew chiefs to restrain themselves from further retributive incidents.

In a side note to this incident, Gordon put the helmet up for auction on eBay for the benefit of his race team's sponsor Harrah's relief efforts of Hurricane Katrina, and Waltrip signed the helmet as well. At one point, bidding was stopped at $10 million (US) because the bidding was getting out of hand. When the auction reopened, internet gambling site Goldenpalace.com won the bidding, paying $51,100 (US).

Top Ten Results

 12- Ryan Newman
 20- Tony Stewart
 17- Matt Kenseth
 16- Greg Biffle
 8- Dale Earnhardt Jr.
 2- Rusty Wallace
 6- Mark Martin
 48- Jimmie Johnson
 31- Jeff Burton
 29- Kevin Harvick

Failed to qualify: Carl Long (#00), Morgan Shepherd (#89), Stanton Barrett (#95), Mike Garvey (#66), Tony Raines (#37), Kirk Shelmerdine (#27)

MBNA NASCAR RacePoints 400 

 Complete Results

The MBNA NASCAR RacePoints 400 was held on September 25 at Dover International Speedway. Ryan Newman sat on the pole and won the Busch Series race the day before. Several Chase for the Cup contenders had difficulties with tire problems that caused them to finish poorly, including Matt Kenseth (35th), Greg Biffle (13th), and Kurt Busch (23rd), who led the most laps in the race. Jimmie Johnson battled his teammate Kyle Busch at the end of the race, but Johnson was able to hold on to win. With the win, Johnson moved into the lead in the Chase for the Nextel Cup.

The race was extended by four laps because of the green-white-checkered finish rule.

Top Ten Results

 48- Jimmie Johnson
 5- Kyle Busch
 2- Rusty Wallace
 6- Mark Martin
 12- Ryan Newman
 38- Elliott Sadler
 19- Jeremy Mayfield
 45- Kyle Petty
 99- Carl Edwards
 41- Casey Mears

Failed to qualify: Morgan Shepherd (#89), Hermie Sadler (#92), Ryan McGlynn (#08), Joey McCarthy (#34)
 Last career top 5 finish for Rusty Wallace.

UAW-Ford 500 
 Complete Results

The UAW-Ford 500 was held on October 2 at Talladega Superspeedway. The race was peppered by some early wrecks at this restrictor-plate race. On lap 19, Jimmie Johnson spun Elliott Sadler which caused a large wreck that also ended the day for Mark Martin, Dale Earnhardt Jr., and Michael Waltrip, who was sent flipping twice across the track. On lap 66, Ryan Newman spun Casey Mears, leading to a 10-car accident that also took out Jeff Burton, Greg Biffle, and sent Scott Riggs tumbling end over end.

The leaders battled at the end of the race, but after Ken Schrader got a flat tire and brought out the yellow on lap 185 of 188, Dale Jarrett took the checkered in a race that was extended by 2 laps due to the green-white-checkered finish rule but ended before the end of the final lap due to the caution coming out for an accident by Kyle Petty.

Also, parts of the movie Talladega Nights: The Ballad of Ricky Bobby were filmed during this race.

Top Ten Results

 88- Dale Jarrett
 20- Tony Stewart
 12- Ryan Newman
 99- Carl Edwards
 17- Matt Kenseth
 25- Brian Vickers
 40- Sterling Marlin
 97- Kurt Busch
 01- Joe Nemechek
 29- Kevin Harvick

Failed to qualify: Bobby Hamilton Jr. (#32), Johnny Sauter (#09), Morgan Shepherd (#89)

Note: Although Hamilton Jr. had failed to qualify his PPI Motorsports Chevrolet, his team bought the No. 92 Front Row Motorsports entry that was to be driven by Mike Skinner and put Hamilton in the car. Skinner's team bought the No. 34 Mach One Racing entry that Hermie Sadler had qualified. Skinner drove the car, leaving Sadler without a ride.
 This was Dale Jarrett's 32nd and final career Cup Series win.
 This would be the final win for Robert Yates Racing.
 This was the first time since 2000 that a DEI car would not win a restrictor-plate race at any point in the year. It was also the first time since 1997 that an Earnhardt failed to win a restrictor-plate race at any point in the year.
 This would be the 7th and final career Cup Series start for Kerry Earnhardt. This would also be the only Cup Series race that Kerry finished ahead of his younger brother Dale Jr. Kerry finished 39th, and Dale Jr. finished 40th.
 Last points race without Denny Hamlin on the grid until the 2013 STP Gas Booster 500.

Banquet 400 
 Complete Results

The Banquet 400 was held on October 9 at Kansas Speedway. Matt Kenseth sat on the pole. Mark Martin got his first victory of the season as Roush Racing cars finished 1–2–3. Chase for the Nextel Cup drivers finished in the top seven positions. The race also marked the Nextel Cup debut for Denny Hamlin, who finished 32nd.

Top Ten Results

 6- Mark Martin
 16- Greg Biffle
 99- Carl Edwards
 20- Tony Stewart
 17- Matt Kenseth
 48- Jimmie Johnson
 2- Rusty Wallace
 41- Casey Mears
 21- Ricky Rudd
 24- Jeff Gordon

Failed to qualify: Robby Gordon (#7), Wayne Anderson (#61), Tony Raines (#37), Carl Long (#00), Greg Sacks (#13), Eric McClure (#34)
 Last career top 10 finish for Rusty Wallace.
 This would be Mark Martin's final win with Roush Racing.

UAW-GM Quality 500 
 Complete Results

The race held on October 15 at Lowe's Motor Speedway was delayed by the finish of the Southern California-Notre Dame college football game which was being broadcast on NBC by forty-five minutes and ended after midnight (EDT) because of the green-white-checkered finish rule. The race was marred by multiple tire problems, similar to the 2005 United States Grand Prix where tires seemed to "self-destruct" on their own. This was caused by a recent levigation of the track and Goodyear failing to bring an adequate tire to the track. Even with drivers driving at 75% speed, tires continued to explode due to excessive heat in the right-front tire. Not even series point leader and eventual champion Tony Stewart was exempt. At one point, NASCAR even considered calling the race, although they ended up throwing caution flags instead. When the smoke cleared, Jimmie Johnson won his fourth straight points-paying race at Lowe's and surged into a tie with Tony Stewart for the top of the standings. Stewart, who has five wins, holds the tie-breaker and retained the lead, finishing 25th. The top three finishers were involved in the 2005 Chase for the NEXTEL Cup.

Top Ten Results

 48- Jimmie Johnson
 97- Kurt Busch
 16- Greg Biffle
 01- Joe Nemechek
 6- Mark Martin
 41- Casey Mears
 12- Ryan Newman
 11- Denny Hamlin
 21- Ricky Rudd
 99- Carl Edwards

Failed to qualify: Boris Said (#36), Carl Long (#00), Jimmy Spencer (#50), Mike Garvey (#37), P. J. Jones (#92), Stanton Barrett (#95)
 With this win, Jimmie Johnson would win 4 straight races at Charlotte Motor Speedway. He would become only the 3rd driver in NASCAR history to win 4 straight superspeedway races at one track, joining Dale Earnhardt Jr. and Bill Elliott. Dale Jr. won 4 Talladega races in a row when he won in the fall of 2001, pulling off the season sweep in 2002, and winning in the spring of 2003. Bill Elliott won 4 Michigan races in a row when he pulled offseason sweeps in 1985 and 1986.
 First career top-10 for Denny Hamlin.

Subway 500 
 Complete Results

The Subway 500 was held on October 23 at Martinsville Speedway. Tony Stewart led the most laps, but Hendrick Motorsports driver Jeff Gordon had the emotional victory, winning almost a year after the tragic plane crash that took the lives of all ten on board, including several members of the Hendrick family.

Top 10 Finishers

 24- Jeff Gordon
 20- Tony Stewart
 48- Jimmie Johnson
 18- Bobby Labonte
 97- Kurt Busch
 31- Jeff Burton
 42- Jamie McMurray
 11- Denny Hamlin
 5- Kyle Busch
 12- Ryan Newman

Failed to qualify: Chad Chaffin (#92), Joey McCarthy (#34), Carl Long (#00), Mike Garvey (#75), Morgan Shepherd (#89), Wayne Anderson (#61)

Bass Pro Shops MBNA 500 

 Complete Results

The Bass Pro Shops MBNA 500 was held October 30 at Atlanta Motor Speedway.

 Top Ten Finishers

 99- Carl Edwards
 24- Jeff Gordon
 6- Mark Martin
 8- Dale Earnhardt Jr.
 17- Matt Kenseth
 42- Jamie McMurray
 16- Greg Biffle
 31- Jeff Burton
 20- Tony Stewart
 38- Elliott Sadler

Failed to qualify: J. J. Yeley (#80), Boris Said (#36), Bobby Hamilton Jr. (#32), Johnny Sauter (#09), Robby Gordon (#7), Stuart Kirby (#51), Mike Wallace (#4), Jimmy Spencer (#50), Mike Garvey (#75), Morgan Shepherd (#89), Shane Hall (#96)

 In only his first full-time Nextel Cup season, Carl Edwards would complete a season sweep at Atlanta.

Dickies 500 

 Complete Results

The inaugural Dickies 500 was held November 6 at Texas Motor Speedway. Carl Edwards won the race – his second in a row – leading a one-two-three finish for Roush Racing. Edwards became the tenth different winner in the races held at "The Great American Speedway."

Top Ten Finishers

 99- Carl Edwards
 6- Mark Martin
 17- Matt Kenseth
 41- Casey Mears
 48- Jimmie Johnson
 20- Tony Stewart
 11- Denny Hamlin
 8- Dale Earnhardt Jr.
 38- Elliott Sadler
 97- Kurt Busch

Failed to qualify: Reed Sorenson (#39), Stuart Kirby (#51), P. J. Jones (#92), Johnny Sauter (#09), Robby Gordon (#7), Carl Long (#00)

 Carl Edwards became the 3rd driver in NASCAR history to win the most races in his first-ever winning season with 4. Billy Wade would be the first driver to accomplish this feat in 1964, and as of 2018, Wade is the only driver in NASCAR history to win his first set of career wins back-to-back when he won 4 in a row. In 2002, after 38 years, his teammate Kurt Busch would be the 2nd driver to win 4 races in his first-ever winning season.
 First time in his career that Carl Edwards would win back-to-back races.

Checker Auto Parts 500 
 Complete Results

The Checker Auto Parts 500 was held November 13 at Phoenix International Raceway. Denny Hamlin, who hadn't competed in a full season in NEXTEL Cup at the time, won the pole. The race was surrounded by controversy when defending champion Kurt Busch was cited for reckless driving and was reported by a cop to have "had the whiff of alcohol", although he was below the legal limit of .008 in Arizona when it was discovered Kurt Busch actually had .0018 in alcohol. Due to his actions, he was suspended by Roush Racing for the rest of the season, and Kenny Wallace took the wheel of the 97 car. Ironically, his brother Kyle won the race, and in victory lane, he criticized the media for their handling of the case.

Top Ten Finishers

 5- Kyle Busch
 16- Greg Biffle
 24- Jeff Gordon
 20- Tony Stewart
 18- Bobby Labonte
 99- Carl Edwards
 48- Jimmie Johnson
 7- Robby Gordon
 88- Dale Jarrett
 77- Travis Kvapil

Failed to qualify: Brandon Ash (#02), Bryan Reffner (#51), Mike Wallace (#4), Kevin Lepage (#66), Derrike Cope (#00), P. J. Jones (#92), Morgan Shepherd (#89)

Ford 400 
 Complete Results

The Ford 400 was held November 20 at Homestead-Miami Speedway. Carl Edwards won the pole and was part of a 1–2–3–4 finish for Roush Racing. Meanwhile, Edwards, Greg Biffle, Tony Stewart, and Jimmie Johnson each had a mathematical chance to win the championship. However, Johnson crashed out at Lap 127 with a blown tire in Turn Three. Despite the fact that Edwards and Biffle finished upfront while Stewart finished 15th, Stewart still clinched the championship. The race was also the last for Rusty Wallace; he retired afterward, having competed in NASCAR Cup racing for 25 years. He finished his career-ending season with an 8th-place points finish. He would finish his career with 55 wins, 36 poles, 202 top 5s, 349 top 10s, and the 1989 Winston Cup Series Championship.

Top Ten Finishers

 16- Greg Biffle
 6- Mark Martin
 17- Matt Kenseth
 99- Carl Edwards
 41- Casey Mears
 07- Dave Blaney
 12- Ryan Newman
 29- Kevin Harvick
 24- Jeff Gordon
 19- Jeremy Mayfield

Failed to qualify: Chad Chaffin (#92), Mike Garvey (#51), Derrike Cope (#00), Morgan Shepherd (#89), Carl Long (#80)

 If the Chase never existed, Tony Stewart would have won the championship regardless. He would have scored a total of 5,174 points in 36 races. He would have won the title by 220 points over Greg Biffle, who would have finished 2nd in points regardless as well.
 1st time since 2002 that Kyle Petty ran every single race in a season.
 This was the last points race without Clint Bowyer until the 2021 Daytona 500.
 This race would be the last time a single team swept the first four finishing positions in a Cup race until Dover in May 2021.

Full Drivers' Championship 

(key) Bold - Pole position awarded by time. Italics - Pole position set by owner's points standings. * – Most laps led.

Rookie of the year 
The 2005 Rookie of the Year battle in NEXTEL Cup was pretty much decided halfway into the season. Twenty-year-old Kyle Busch became a phenomenon by winning twice and breaking the record for the youngest driver to win at NASCAR's premier level. Runner-up Travis Kvapil had a modest season, qualifying for every race, but only finishing in the top-ten twice. After that, the field was quite slim, as only Mike Garvey and Stanton Barrett ran more than seven races during the year. The only other declaree, Eric McClure, had resigned from his No. 73 Raabe Racing Enterprises ride after the season's third race. And while he had run too many races in 2004 to declare for the ROTY award for 2005, Carl Edwards became the most popular first-year driver – winning four races.

See also 
 2005 NASCAR Busch Series
 2005 NASCAR Craftsman Truck Series
 2005 Chase for the Nextel Cup

References

External links 
 Racing Reference 

 
NASCAR Cup Series seasons